Caloptilia cryphia is a moth of the family Gracillariidae. It is known from Namibia.

References

Endemic fauna of Namibia
cryphia
Insects of Namibia
Moths of Africa
Moths described in 1961